Peter Gordon Fraser was a Scottish public servant and later a politician and artist in Van Diemen's Land.

Fraser was born on 21 March 1808, the fourth child of Donald and Jane Fraser. Fraser commenced work at the Colonial Office in 1835.

Fraser was at one point the "Colonial Secretary in Van Diemen's Land", a position that later became the Premier of Tasmania.

References

1808 births
1888 deaths
Scottish colonial officials
Scottish civil servants
Scottish emigrants to Australia
Scottish landscape painters